Maude Evelyn Ashton Fletcher Copp (February 4, 1872 – January 2, 1945) created a method for teaching children how to play the piano: the Fletcher Music Method.

Copp influenced music educationalist Nellie Cornish, who studied the visual method with her in Boston and for a time taught it in Seattle prior to founding her Cornish School. She describes the method in her autobiography Miss Aunt Nellie:

Biography
She was born on February 4, 1872, as Maude Evelyn Ashton Fletcher in Woodstock, Ontario to Ashton Fletcher and Annie Stedson. She married Alfred Ebenezer Copp on May 8, 1901, in Manhattan, New York City, and had a son, Theodore Bayard Fletcher Copp (1902–1945), who became an author.

She died on January 2, 1945. Her son died the next day, right after completing his mother's obituary.

References

American music educators
American women music educators
1872 births
1945 deaths
American women academics
People from Woodstock, Ontario